Lim Chul-Woo (Hangul: 임철우) is a South Korean writer born in 1954, known for his subversive works.

Life
Im Chul-woo was born October 15, 1954, on Wando Island in Jeollanam-do. He moved to Gwangju at age 10  and attended Sung-il High School there. He graduated from Jeonnam University with a degree in English Literature and completed graduate programs in English Literature at both Sogang University and Jeonnam University. Presently, he teaches Creative Writing at Hanshin University.  Im was in Gwangju during the Gwangju Uprising and this critically influenced his outlook. His work has centered around dramatizations of that event and works which more generally focus on issues of Korean separation.

His debut was The Dog Thief in 1981  In 1985 he was awarded the 17th Korean Creative Writing Prize for The Land of My Father (Abeoji ui ttang) and in 1988 was awarded the 12th Yi Sang Literature Prize for The Red Room (Bulgeun bang), which has since been published in an anthology of the same name.

In 1994 Im's novel, I Want to Go to the Island was made into a Korean movie, To the Starry Island.

Work

Lim Chul-Woo is known as a subversive author. One year after the Gwangju Uprising Lim published his first short story, Dog Thief, which focused on the national division and violence of Korean ideological conflict. Most of LIm's writing focuses on the Gwangju Uprising of the Korean War as a setting in which to explore the psychology of guilt. Lim's work on the Gwangju Uprising culminated in Spring Day, a five-volume novel written over eight years.

Works in English
 My Father's Land (in The Star and Other Korean Short Stories)
 The Red Room (in Red Room)
 Straight Lines and Poison Gas - At the Hospital Wards (2013)
 The Island

Works in Korean (Partial)
 I Want to Go to the Island
 Red Mountain, White Bird
 Spring Day

Awards
 17th Korean Creative Writing Prize for “The Land of My Father” (Abeoji ui ttang, 1985)
 12th Yi Sang Literary Award for “The Red Room” (Bulgeun bang, 1988).

References

External links
 Review of the collection The Red Room at KTLIT

1954 births
South Korean novelists
Living people
Sogang University alumni